Yordan Marinov (born 23 June 1968) is a Bulgarian former footballer who played as a midfielder.

Career
Between 1997 and 1999, Marinov appeared in 28 top division matches for Levski Sofia, netting 1 goal. In 1998, he also won a Bulgarian Cup with the "bluemen". In total, Marinov donned the colours of 9 teams in the A PFG, including Akademik Svishtov, Lokomotiv Gorna Oryahovitsa, CSKA Sofia, Slavia Sofia, Loko Plovdiv, Loko Sofia, Hebar Pazardzhik, and Belasitsa Petrich.

Honours

Club
Lokomotiv Sofia
 Bulgarian Cup: 1995

Levski Sofia
 Bulgarian Cup: 1998

References

External links
Player Profile at Lportala.net

1968 births
Living people
Bulgarian footballers
Association football midfielders
PFC Akademik Svishtov players
FC Lokomotiv Gorna Oryahovitsa players
PFC CSKA Sofia players
PFC Slavia Sofia players
PFC Lokomotiv Plovdiv players
FC Lokomotiv 1929 Sofia players
PFC Levski Sofia players
PFC Belasitsa Petrich players
First Professional Football League (Bulgaria) players